Yakima Electric Railway may refer to:
 Yakima Electric Railway Museum
 Yakima Valley Transportation Company